2,4-Dithiapentane is an organosulfur compound. It is a colorless liquid with a strong odor.

2,4-Dithiapentane is the dimethyldithioacetal of formaldehyde. It is prepared by the acid-catalyzed condensation of methyl mercaptan, the main aromatic compound in both halitosis and foot odor and a secondary compound in flatulence, with formaldehyde.
2 CH3SH  +  H2C=O   →   CH3SCH2SCH3  +  H2O

2,4-Dithiapentane is found as an aromatic component in some truffle varietals. A synthetic version is used as the primary aromatic additive in commercial "truffle" products, such as truffle oil, truffle butter, truffle salt, pastes, etc., many of which contain no truffle content at all. It has also been found to occur naturally in rotting wood of some species in genus Lecythis.

Notes and references 

Thioethers